Susan J. Blommaert (born October 13, 1947) is an American actress. She is best known for her role as Mr. Kaplan on the NBC drama series The Blacklist, and for her recurring role as Judge Rebecca Steinman in Law & Order, Law & Order: Special Victims Unit, and Law & Order: Trial by Jury. She has portrayed judges in a number of legal dramas, including Judge Rudy Fox in The Practice, Judge Barbara Burke in Family Law, and Judge Hanlon	in Bull.

Filmography

Films

Television

Video games

References

External links
 
 

1947 births
Living people
American film actresses
American television actresses
American video game actresses
Place of birth missing (living people)
20th-century American actresses
21st-century American actresses